The 2009–10 Second and Third Division Knock-Out (known as quick Keno Second and Third Division Knock-Out for sponsorship reasons) was a knockout tournament for Maltese football clubs playing in the Second and Third Division. The competition was held between 31 August 2009 and 22 May 2010, with the winners being Third Division side Żejtun Corinthians.

Group stage

Group 1

Group 2

Group 3

Group 4

Group 5

Group 6

Group 7

Group 8

Knockout phase

See also 
 2009–10 Maltese Second Division
 2009–10 Maltese Third Division

Maltese Second and Third Division Knock-Out
knock-out